Cuvelai, Cunene is one of three towns of this name in Angola.

Transport 

Cuvelai is not currently served by rail, but in 2008 a proposed railway line linking Angola and Namibia would serve this town.

See also 

 Transport in Angola
 Railway stations in Angola

References 

Populated places in Angola